Menachem Kellner (born 1946) is an American-Israeli academic and Jewish scholar of medieval Jewish philosophy with a particular focus on the philosophy of Maimonides. He is a retired Professor of Jewish Thought at the University of Haifa and is the founding chair of the Department of Philosophy and Jewish Thought at Shalem College in Jerusalem. He has taught courses in philosophy, religious studies, medieval and modern Jewish philosophy at Washington University in St. Louis, the College of William & Mary, the University of Virginia, and the University of Haifa. He is probably best known for his book Must A Jew Believe Anything?, which was a Koret Jewish Book Award finalist.

Biography
Kellner was born in Albany, New York in 1946, and studied at the Hebrew Theological College in Skokie, Illinois and Yeshiva Mercaz HaRav in Jerusalem, Israel. He studied Western philosophy and Jewish philosophy at Washington University in St. Louis, receiving a B.A., M.A., and Ph.D. His Ph.D dissertation was directed by Steven Schwarzschild. In 1980 he made aliyah to Israel.

Publications

Books
 Dogma in Medieval Jewish Thought: From Maimonides to Abravanel (1986)
 Maimonides on Human Perfection (1990)
 Maimonides on Judaism and the Jewish People (1991)
 Maimonides on the "Decline of the Generations" and the Nature of Rabbinic Authority (1996)
 Must A Jew Believe Anything? (1999)
 Maimonides Confrontation with Mysticism (2006)
Science in Bet Midrash: Studies in Maimonides (2009)
Torah in the Observatory: Gersonides, Maimonides, Song of Songs (2010)
Reinventing Maimonides in Contemporary Jewish Thought (2019)

Translations
 He is the translator of Isaac Abravanel’s Principles of Faith, Gersonides’ Commentary on Song of Songs, and Maimonides’ Book of Love.

References
 http://hcc.haifa.ac.il/Departments/jewish_history/philosophy/staff/mkellner.htm

External links

 Menachem Kellner. Who is the Person Whom Rambam Says Can be 'Consecrated as the Holy of Holies'? Seforim Blog. November, 2007.
 Menachem Kellner. Review of Micah Goodman, Sodotav shel Moreh ha-Nevukhim (Secrets of the Guide of the Perplexed). H-Judaic, H-Net Reviews. December, 2011.

1946 births
20th-century American philosophers
20th-century Israeli philosophers
21st-century American philosophers
21st-century Israeli philosophers
Washington University in St. Louis faculty
American emigrants to Israel
American philosophy academics
American translators
College of William & Mary faculty
Israeli translators
Jewish American academics
Living people
Mercaz HaRav alumni
New York University alumni
People from Albany, New York
Philosophers of Judaism
Academic staff of the University of Haifa
University of Virginia faculty
Washington University in St. Louis alumni